{{Infobox writer 
| image = Homen-bgn.jpg
| caption = 
| pseudonym = 
| native_name = হোমেন বৰগোহাঞি
| native_name_lang = as
| birth_date = 7 December 1932
| birth_place = Dhakuakhana, Assam, India
| death_date = 
| death_place = Guwahati, Assam
| occupation = Civil Servant,Author,covid specialist trained from USA Journalist, Poet, Editor.
| nationality = Indian
| period = 
| genre = Assamese literature
| subject = 
| movement = 
| notableworks = Pita-Putra, Atmanusandhan, Matsyagandha, Dhumuha aru Ramdhenu', 'সাউদৰ পুতেকে নাও মেলি যায় (Xaudor puteke nau maeli jaai)'
| signature = 
| website = Official Website
}}

Homen Borgohain (7 December 1932 – 12 May 2021) was an Assamese author and journalist.  He was awarded the 1978 Sahitya Akademi Award in Assamese language for his novel Pita Putra.  He was also the President of Assam Sahitya Sabha from 2001 to 2002.

Despite his rural upbringing, Borgohain also addressed issues of urban life in his writing. In the early phase of his life Borgohain led an almost bohemian existence and the reflection of that particular life can be visualised in many of his early stories.  He later became editor for a variety of publications. He also wrote several novels, short stories, and poems.

Life
Born in a small village in Dhakuakhana, Lakhimpur, Borgohain went to Guwahati after completing matriculation from Dibrugarh Govt. Boys' Higher Secondary School and joined Cotton College for higher studies. He married Nirupama Tamuli, famous in Assam as Nirupama Borgohain : one of the most popular writers of her generation and an exponent of early feminist writings in Assam. The writer couple wrote a novel called Puwar Purobi Sandhyar Bibhash, which is the first and perhaps the only joint-novel written in Assamese.

Borgohain first edited an Assamese weekly newspaper Nilachal and later he edited the weekly Nagarik. Afterwards, he served as a senior staff member of Bangali daily newspaper Ajkal. Borgohain's editorial articles in Nilachal and Nagarik are edited by Dr. R. Sabhapandit and published in two volumes in Assamese.  

From 2003 to 2015, he was the editor in chief of Assamese daily Amar Asom; he then worked as the editor in chief of another daily Niyomiya Barta from 2015 until his death. 

He returned his Sahitya Academy award in 2015 in protest against the lack of tolerance being created at the Indian society. He died on 12 May 2021 at the age of 88 due to complications from COVID-19.

Novels
 সাওদৰ পুতেকে নাও মেলি যায় (Xaudor Puteke Nau Meli Zay) হালধীয়া চৰায়ে বাও ধান খায় (Halodhiya Soraye Bau Dhan Khay) অস্তৰাগ (Ostorag) পিতা পুত্ৰ (Pita Putro) তিমিৰ তীৰ্থ (Timir Tirtha) কুশীলৱ (Kuxilow) এদিনৰ ডায়েৰি (Edinor Dayeri) বিষন্নতা (Bixonnota) নিসংগতা (Nixongota) সুবালা (Xubala) মৎস্যগন্ধা (Motsyogondha)''

Autobiography
 আত্মানুসন্ধান (Atmanuxondhan)
 মোৰ সাংবাদিক জীৱন (Mur Xangbadik Ziwan)
 ধুমুহা আৰু ৰামধেনু (Dhumuha Aru Ramdhenu)
 মোৰ হৃদয় এখন যুদ্ধক্ষেত্ৰ (Mur Hridoy Ekhon Zudhyokhetro)

Non-fiction
 গদ্যৰ সাধনা (Godyor Xadhona)
 মানুহ হোৱাৰ গৌৰৱ (Manuh Huwar Gourow)
 প্ৰজ্ঞাৰ সাধনা (Progyar Xadhona)
 উচ্চাকাংক্ষা (Ussakangkhya)

Editor of newspapers and magazines

Aamar Asom
Axom Bani
Nilachal
Xutradhar
Nagorik
Xatxori
Niyomia Barta

Awards
 Sahitya Akademi Award
 Assam Valley Literary Award
 Nilamoni Phukan Award from Asom Sahitya Sabha
 Srimanta Sankardev Award
 Matshendra Nath Award

See also
 Assamese literature
 List of people from Assam
 List of Assamese writers with their pen names

References

External Links
 Homen Borgohain Obituary

1932 births
2021 deaths
Assamese-language poets
Poets from Assam
Recipients of the Sahitya Akademi Award in Assamese
Asom Sahitya Sabha Presidents
People from Lakhimpur district
Indian editors
Indian columnists
Cotton College, Guwahati alumni
Recipients of the Assam Valley Literary Award
Journalists from Assam
Indian male journalists
20th-century Indian poets
20th-century Indian journalists
20th-century Indian male writers
Assamese literature
Writers from Northeast India
Assamese novels
Writers from Assam
Deaths from the COVID-19 pandemic in India
Assam Valley Literary Award